Hervé Gabriel Ngamago Youmbi, born in Bangui, Central African Republic on March 25, 1973, is a Cameroonian artist who lives and works in Douala. He is a founding member of the Cercle Kapsiki, a collective of five Cameroonian artists, founded in 1998.

Biography

Hervé Youmbi has a diploma from the Institut de Formation Artistique (IFA) in Mbalmayo, Cameroon, and later studied at the École Supérieure des Arts Décoratifs de Strasbourg (France) from October 2000 to June 2001. He teaches art at several towns in Cameroon, at the art institutes of Nkongsamba and Foumban, and in the art academies and universities of Douala and Dschang.

Portraiture is the basis of Youmbi's work. Through a close study of the human body in an urban setting, he asks questions about his city, the towns where he has stayed, and places he has passed through and dreams about getting to know more intimately. These are his sources of inspiration and artistic expression. In 2010, he explores the impact of global capitalism on the contemporary arts in Africa with his multimedia installation Ces totems qui hantent la mémoire des fils de Mamadou (These totems who haunt the memory of the son of Mamadou). The photographic triptych Au nom du père, du fils et de la sainte monarchie constitutionnelle (In the name of the father, the son and the holy constitutional monarchy) from 2012 depicts the violence and uprising against of the dictatorial regimes in Africa. His installation Visages de masques presented at Bandjoun Station (Cameroon) looks at the impact of colonization on the making of ritual masks in Africa during the era of globalization. The treatment of historical subjects has occupied an important place in his work, through works like Cameroonian Heroes, presented during SUD 2007 in Douala, tribute to the first Cameroonian resistance against German colonization.

Hervé Youmbi received the Culturesfrance scholarship awarding him an artist visa in 2009, and the Smithsonian Artist Research Fellowship 2012 from the Smithsonian in Washington DC, USA. His works are in some leading collections, such as the World Bank and the Smithsonian National Museum of African Art in Washington. In 2020, one of his pieces was acquired by the Royal Ontario Museum in Canada.

References

Bibliography
 Lumières d'Afriques. Hervé Youmbi. 
 Africultures. 
 Urbanscénos. Hervé Youmbi. 
 " Masks on the move " article de Silvia Forni dans African Arts summer 2016, Vol 49, number 2, Californie/ USA, 2016
 " Lumières d'Afriques " Catalogue d'exposition Fondation AAD, Paris/ France, 2015
 " Stories tellers " Catalogue d'exposition Bandjoun station, Bandjoun/ Cameroun. 2015
 Arts et cultures d'Afrique. Vers une anthropologie solidaire. Sous la direction de Myrian-Odile Blin. Édition Presses Universitaires de Rouen et du Havre (PURH), Rouen/ France. 2014
 " CAMEROUN Une vision contemporaine 4 " World bank ; Yaoundé/ Cameroun. 2014
 " Hervé Youmbi " Première monographie Texte de Dominique Malaquais pour Les carnets de la création, éditions de l'œil, Paris France. 2011
 " Public Culture " Institute for public knowledge Volume 23 By Duke university press, Durham, NC/USA 2011
 " Africultures n° 83 " Indépendances africaines: chroniques d’une relation, une interview de Virginie andriamirado, éditions l’Harmattan Paris/ France. 2011
 « Anthologie de L'Art african du XX siècle », édition Revue noire, Paris, France.
 Pensa, Iolanda (Ed.) 2017. Public Art in Africa. Art et transformations urbaines à Douala /// Art and Urban Transformations in Douala. Genève: Metis Presses.

See also 
 List of public art in Douala
 African art

External links

1973 births
Living people
Cameroonian contemporary artists